The 2002–03 Spartan South Midlands Football League season is the 6th in the history of Spartan South Midlands Football League a football competition in England.

Premier Division

The Premier Division featured 18 clubs which competed in the division last season, along with two clubs, promoted from Division One:
Greenacres
Harefield United

Also, Bedford United changed name to Bedford United & Valerio and Somersett Ambury V & E changed name to Broxbourne Borough V&E.

League table

Division One

Division One featured 15 clubs which competed in the division last season, along with four new clubs.
Two clubs relegated from the Premier Division:
Brache Sparta
New Bradwell St Peter

Two clubs promoted from Division Two:
Haywood United
Shillington

League table

Division Two

Division Two featured 13 clubs which competed in the division last season, along with two clubs relegated from Division One:
Amersham Town
Winslow United

League table

References

External links
 FCHD Spartan South Midlands Football League page

2002–03
2002–03 in English football leagues